Kızılkese is a village in the Kastamonu, Kastamonu Province, Turkey. Its population is 163 (2021).

References

Villages in Kastamonu District